Straits Sports Centre Stadium is a multi-purpose stadium in Quanzhou, China.  It is currently used mostly for football matches.  The stadium holds 34,000 spectators.  It opened in 2008.

References

Football venues in China
Multi-purpose stadiums in China
Sports venues in Fujian
Sport in Quanzhou